Lee Tae-hui (born 26 April 1995) is a South Korean footballer who plays for Incheon United.

His father is Lee Deok-hwa.

References

External links 
 

1995 births
Living people
South Korean footballers
K League 1 players
Incheon United FC players
Association football goalkeepers